Phyllobacterium ifriqiyense is a Gram-negative bacteria from the genus of Phyllobacterium which was isolated from root nodules from the plants Astragalus algerianus and Lathyrus numidicus.

References

Phyllobacteriaceae
Bacteria described in 2006